Yunyang Subdistrict is an urban subdistrict and the seat of Chaling County in Hunan, China.

Cityscape
The town is divided into 4 villages and 6 communities, the following areas: Jinshan Community, Yandi Community, Mishui Community, Jiaotong Community, Yunpan Community, Layuan Community, Qianjin Village, Nonglin Village, Shibaqiu Village, and Qujiang Village.

References

External links

Divisions of Chaling County
County seats in Hunan